Slender catfish is a common name for several fishes and may refer to:

 Dianema longibarbis, of South America
 Silurus microdorsalis, of Europe and Asia